Klyukvinsky is a rural locality (a settlement) in Lebyazhensky Selsoviet Rural Settlement, Kursky District, Kursk Oblast, Russia. Population:

Geography 
The settlement is located 94 km from the Russia–Ukraine border, 5 km south-east of the district center – the town Kursk, 10 km from the selsoviet center – Cheryomushki.

 Climate
Klyukvinsky has a warm-summer humid continental climate (Dfb in the Köppen climate classification).

Transport 
Klyukvinsky is located 0.8 km from European route  (Ukraine – Russia (Rylsk, Kursk, Voronezh, Borisoglebsk, Saratov, Yershov) – Kazakhstan), 1.5 km from the road of regional importance  (Kursk – Bolshoye Shumakovo – Polevaya via Lebyazhye), 1 km from the nearest railway station Klyukva (railway line Klyukva — Belgorod).

The rural locality is situated 7.5 km from Kursk Vostochny Airport, 117 km from Belgorod International Airport and 204 km from Voronezh Peter the Great Airport.

References

Notes

Sources

Rural localities in Kursky District, Kursk Oblast